The Rasiva is a mountain of the Swiss Lepontine Alps, located north-west of Brione in the canton of Ticino. It lies on the range east of Monte Zucchero, between the Val Redòrta and the Val d'Osura.

References

External links
 Rasiva on Hikr

Mountains of the Alps
Mountains of Ticino
Lepontine Alps
Mountains of Switzerland